Kirsten Carlsen (born 9 January 1938) is a Danish cross-country skier. She competed in two events at the 1968 Winter Olympics.

References

External links
 

1938 births
Living people
Danish female cross-country skiers
Olympic cross-country skiers of Denmark
Cross-country skiers at the 1968 Winter Olympics
Sportspeople from Copenhagen